John Herman Stephenson (born April 13, 1941) is a retired American professional baseball player who was a catcher in the Major Leagues from 1964 to 1973. He played for the San Francisco Giants, Chicago Cubs, New York Mets, and California Angels.  On June 21, 1964, while with the Mets, he struck out for the final out of Jim Bunning's perfect game. John holds a degree from William Carey College in Hattiesburg, Mississippi. He has gone on to coach extensively in the major and minor leagues as well as college.

References

External links
 

1941 births
Living people
Auburn Mets players
Baseball players from Kentucky
Buffalo Bisons (minor league) players
California Angels players
Chicago Cubs players
Jacksonville Suns players
Major League Baseball catchers
Minor league baseball managers
New York Mets players
People from Greenup County, Kentucky
Phoenix Giants players
Raleigh Mets players
Salt Lake City Angels players
San Francisco Giants players
Southeastern Louisiana Lions baseball coaches
Tacoma Cubs players
William Carey University alumni